Tawang district (Pron:/tɑ:ˈwæŋ or təˈwæŋ/) is the smallest of the 26 administrative districts of Arunachal Pradesh state in northeastern India. With a population of 49,977, it is the eighth least populous district in the country (out of 707).

History 

Tawang is inhabited by the Monpa people.  From 500 BC to 600 AD a kingdom known as Lhomon or Monyul ruled the area. The Monyul kingdom was later absorbed into the control of neighbouring Bhutan and Tibet.

Tawang Monastery was founded by the Merak Lama Lodre Gyatso in 1681 in accordance with the wishes of the 5th Dalai Lama, Ngawang Lobsang Gyatso, and has an interesting legend surrounding its name, which means "Chosen by Horse". The sixth Dalai Lama, Tsangyang Gyatso, was born in Tawang.

Tawang was historically part of Tibet. The 1914 Simla Accord defined the McMahon Line as the new boundary between British India and Tibet. By this treaty, Tibet relinquished several hundred square miles of its territory, including Tawang, to the British, but it was not recognised by China. When Tibet was not governed by mainland China, Tawang was easily accessible to Tibetans.

In 1938, the British made a cautious move to assert sovereignty over Tawang by sending a small military column under Capt. G.S. Lightfoot to Tawang.

After the outbreak of the war with Japan in 1941, the government of Assam undertook a number of 'forward policy' measures to tighten their hold on the North East Frontier Agency (NEFA) area, which later became Arunachal Pradesh. In 1944, administrative control was extended over the area of the Tawang tract lying South of the Sela Pass when J.P. Mills set up an Assam Rifles post at Dirang Dzong. However, no steps were taken to evict the Tibetan from the area North of the pass which contained Tawang town.

Tibet lost its independence in 1950's and was annexed into the newly established People's Republic of China. Tibet also lost its independent diplomatic freedom and Tawang was now a stress point between India and China.

During the Sino-Indian war of 1962, Tawang fell briefly under Chinese control, but China withdrew its troops at the end of the war.  Tawang again came under Indian administration.

Tawang district was formed in 1989, when it was split from West Kameng district.

Geography
Tawang district occupies an area of ,. The district is roughly located around latitude 27° 45’ N and longitude 90° 15’ E at the northwest extremity of South Tibet.

The district was carved out of the West Kameng district, which adjoins it to the south and east. Bhutan borders Tawang to the west whereas Tibet is to the north of the district. The district occupies an area of 2,085 square kilometres and has a population of 38,924 (as of 2001), almost 75% of which are considered "tribal", i.e. belonging to the native Monpa, Bhotia, Adi, etc. The sensitivity of the border area brings Tawang a heavy military presence.
In winter, Tawang frequently experiences heavy snowfall.

Administrative divisions
The district is divided into 3 sub-divisions: Tawang, Lumla and Jang. Tawang sub-division is divided into 2 administrative circles: Tawang and Kitpi. Lumla sub-division is divided into 4 administrative circles: Bongkhar, Dudunghar, Lumla and Zemithang. Jang sub-division is divided into 4 administrative circles: Jang, Mukto, Thingbu and Lhou.

There are 3 Arunachal Pradesh Legislative Assembly constituencies located in this district: Lumla, Tawang and Mukto. All of these are part of Arunachal West Lok Sabha constituency.

Villages
 

Lhau

Demographics 
According to the 2011 census Tawang district has a population of 49,977, roughly equal to the nation of Saint Kitts and Nevis. This gives it a ranking of 633rd in India (out of a total of 640). Its population growth rate over the decade 2001–2011 was 28.33%.	Tawang	has a sex ratio of 	940	females for every 1000 males, and a literacy rate of 60.61%.

Language
A sizeable population of 20,000 live in Tawang town. The dominant ethnic group are the Monpa, who inhabit all of the 163 villages. The Tibetan are also found in small scattered numbers throughout Tawang.  The Takpa, a small tribal group, are found in small, scattered numbers in the West and the North.

Religion

Most of the people, which includes the Monpa, Takpa and the Tibetans, are Tibetan Buddhist by religion. Pre-Buddhist Bön and Shamanist influence is also evident. Festivals that include Losar, Choskar, and Torgya are held annually. The Dungyur is also celebrated in every three years of the Torgya. Both the Dungyur and Torgya festivals are celebrated at the Tawang Monastery with traditional gaiety and enthusiasm.

Transport
The  proposed Mago-Thingbu to Vijaynagar Arunachal Pradesh Frontier Highway along the McMahon Line, (will intersect with the proposed East-West Industrial Corridor Highway) and will pass through here, alignment map of which can be seen here and here.

Economy 
Most of the tribes depend on agriculture for a living. Owing to Tawang's cold climate, farmers breed yak and sheep, although in lower altitudes crops are also planted.

Tourism
Tawang is a popular tourist destination thanks to the well-preserved Tawang Monastery. The Sela Pass rises steeply and is covered with snow for most of the year. Chumi Gyatse Falls and Jang waterfall is a big tourist attraction.

Tawang district has a handicrafts centre that promotes the small-scale industries for local handicrafts.

Visitors to Tawang district require a special Inner Line Permit from the government which are available in Kolkata, Guwahati, Tezpur, and New Delhi. Tourists can travel to Tawang from Tezpur, Assam by road. Tezpur has direct flights from Kolkata. Guwahati, Assam, is 16 hours by road. In June 2008, a daily helicopter service from Guwahati was started by the Arunachal Pradesh government.

Road travel to Tawang from Tezpur, Assam, is by buses, private taxis and shared taxis. It is an arduous journey: most of the road is loose tarmac and gravel giving way to mud in many places. However, it is a scenic journey of nearly 12 hours, crossing Bomdila Pass 2,438 metres (8,000 feet), peaking at Sela Pass 4,176 metres (13,700 feet), Jaswant Garh and, finally, Tawang. Government buses often break down (usually on the way up) and passengers end up hitchhiking in private cars and taxis. En route, local food is available, especially meat and vegetarian momos and cream buns.

Tawang also hosted the 2nd International Tourism Mart in October 2013.

Culture

Tawang Monastery

The Tawang Monastery was founded by the Mera Lama Lodre Gyatso in accordance to the wishes of the 5th Dalai Lama, Nagwang Lobsang Gyatso. The monastery belongs to the Gelugpa sect and is the largest Buddhist monastery in India. It is associated with Drepung Monastery in Lhasa. The name Tawang means Chosen Horse. It is also known by another Tibetan name, Galden Namgey Lhatse, which means a true name within a celestial paradise in a clear night.

Dalai Lama
When the current Dalai Lama (14th Dalai Lama) fled from Tibet in 1959 to escape from the Chinese army, he crossed into India on 30 March 1959 and spent some days resting at Tawang Monastery before reaching Tezpur in Assam on 18 April. As recently as 2003, the Dalai Lama said that Tawang was "actually part of Tibet".  He reversed his position in 2008, acknowledging the legitimacy of the McMahon Line and the Indian claim to the region.

The Dalai Lama visited Tawang district on 8 November 2009.  About 30,000 persons, including those from neighbouring Nepal and Bhutan, attended his religious discourse.

References

External links 

 Tawang district marked on OpenStreetMap
Tawang multilingual site
 Tawang District Government Website
Tawang travel guide from Wikivoyage

 
Districts of Arunachal Pradesh
Minority Concentrated Districts in India
1989 establishments in Andhra Pradesh